KYVA-FM (103.7 FM) is a radio station broadcasting a classic hits music format. Licensed to Church Rock, New Mexico, United States. The station is currently owned by Millennium Media.

References

External links

YVA-FM
Radio stations established in 1982
1982 establishments in New Mexico
Classic hits radio stations in the United States